MJN v News Group Newspapers [2011] EWHC 1192 was a 2011 privacy case in English law decided by the High Court of Justice, in which a Premiership footballer obtained an injunction to prevent the publication of the details of an extra-marital affair which the footballer is alleged to have had with the lingerie model Kimberley West.

See also
2011 British privacy injunctions controversy

References

External links
Bailii

High Court of Justice cases
English privacy case law
2011 in England
2011 in case law
News UK
Marriage, unions and partnerships in England
2011 in British law